Tár is a 2022 psychological drama film written and directed by Todd Field. It stars Cate Blanchett as Lydia Tár, a renowned conductor who is accused of sexual misconduct. The supporting cast includes Nina Hoss, Noémie Merlant, Sophie Kauer, Julian Glover, Allan Corduner, and Mark Strong. Tár premiered at the 79th Venice International Film Festival in September 2022, where Blanchett won the Volpi Cup for Best Actress. The film had a limited theatrical release in the United States on October 7, 2022, before a wide release on October 28, by Focus Features.

Tár became the fourth film in history to be named the best of the year by the New York Film Critics Circle, the Los Angeles Film Critics Association, the London Film Critics' Circle and the National Society of Film Critics. It was named the year's best film by more critics than any other film released in 2022. At the 95th Academy Awards, Tár was nominated for six awards, including Best Picture and Best Director. For her performance, Blanchett won Best Actress at the BAFTAs, Golden Globes, and Critics' Choice Movie Awards. She was also nominated at the Academy Awards and Screen Actors Guild Awards.

Plot 
Lydia Tár is the first female chief conductor of the Berlin Philharmonic. She relies on Francesca, her personal assistant, and Sharon, her wife and concertmaster. During an interview with Adam Gopnik at The New Yorker Festival, Lydia promotes her upcoming live recording of Mahler's Fifth Symphony and book Tár on Tár. Lydia meets with Eliot Kaplan, an investment banker and amateur conductor who co-founded the Accordion Foundation with Lydia to support aspiring female conductors. They discuss technique, replacing Lydia's assistant conductor Sebastian, and filling a vacant cello position in Berlin.

Lydia holds a masterclass at the Juilliard School. She challenges a student for dismissing white male composers such as J. S. Bach, encouraging students to focus on the music over the gender stereotype. Before returning to Berlin, Lydia receives a first edition of Vita Sackville-West's novel Challenge from Krista Taylor, a former Accordion fellow. Lydia tears out the title page, which Krista has embellished, and throws away the book.

Before a blind audition for the cello position, Lydia spots a Russian candidate, Olga Metkina, in the bathroom. Lydia changes her scorecard to ensure Olga a spot in the orchestra and grants her a soloist position in the companion piece, Edward Elgar's Cello Concerto. As Lydia prepares for the recording, her relationships with Francesca and Sharon grow strained, as they recognize her attraction to Olga.

After sending desperate emails to Francesca, Krista kills herself. Lydia instructs Francesca to delete emails involving Krista and retains a lawyer, as Krista's parents plan to sue. Lydia informs Sebastian of his replacement. Incensed, he indicates the orchestra is aware of her favoritism and that it suggests abusive behavior. He speculates Francesca will replace him, implying an exchange of sexual favors. Lydia plans to replace Sebastian with a different candidate.

Lydia is haunted by screaming women in the distance, nightmares, chronic pain, an increasing sensitivity to sound, and enigmatic scribbles resembling those Krista once made. While trying to complete a composition, she is disturbed by the sound of a medical device next door, where her neighbor is caring for her dying mother. An edited video of Lydia's Juilliard class goes viral and an article accusing her of sexual predation appears in the New York Post. Lydia, accompanied by Olga, returns to New York to attend a deposition for the lawsuit of Krista's parents and to promote her book; they are met by protestors. During the deposition, the plaintiffs ask Lydia about incriminating emails between Francesca and Krista.

In Berlin, Lydia is removed as conductor due to the controversy. Furious over the allegations and Lydia's lack of communication, Sharon bars Lydia from seeing their daughter, Petra. Lydia retreats to her old studio and grows increasingly depressed and deranged. She sneaks into the live recording of Mahler's Fifth and assaults her replacement, Eliot.  Advised to lie low by her management agency, she returns to her childhood home on Staten Island, with certificates of achievement bearing her birth name, Linda Tarr. She tearfully watches an old tape of Young People's Concerts in which Leonard Bernstein discusses the meaning of music. Her brother Tony arrives and admonishes her for forgetting her roots.

Some time later, Lydia finds undemanding work conducting in an unidentified country in Asia. Seeking a massage, she asks the hotel concierge for a recommendation. She is sent to a brothel, where numerous young women in numbered robes are seated. After one woman looks into Lydia's eyes, Lydia rushes outside to vomit. The number on the young woman's robe is 5, as in Mahler's symphony number 5. Lydia had recorded all symphonies from Mahler except the 5th she left for last on purpose, as she tells us in the interview for the New Yorker. With her new orchestra, Lydia conducts the score for the video game series Monster Hunter in front of an audience of cosplayers.

Cast 
 Cate Blanchett as Lydia Tár, a world-famous composer-conductor
 Nina Hoss as Sharon Goodnow, a concertmaster and Lydia's wife
 Noémie Merlant as Francesca Lentini, Lydia's assistant
 Sophie Kauer as Olga Metkina, a young Russian cellist
 Julian Glover as Andris Davis, Lydia's predecessor
 Allan Corduner as Sebastian Brix, Lydia's assistant conductor
 Mark Strong as Eliot Kaplan, an investment banker, amateur conductor, and manager of Lydia's fellowship program
 Sylvia Flote as Krista Taylor, a former member of Lydia's fellowship program
 Adam Gopnik as himself, Lydia's interviewer at The New Yorker Festival
 Mila Bogojevic as Petra, Lydia and Sharon's daughter
 Zethphan Smith-Gneist as Max, a Juilliard student
 Lee Sellars as Tony Tarr, Lydia's brother
 Sydney Lemmon as Whitney Reese, a fan of Lydia

Production 

It was announced in April 2021 that Blanchett would star in and executive-produce the film, which would be written and directed by Todd Field. In a statement accompanying the teaser trailer in August 2022, Field said that he wrote the script for Blanchett, and that he would not have made the film if she had declined it. In September 2021, Nina Hoss and Noémie Merlant joined the cast, and Hildur Guðnadóttir became the film's composer.

Filming began in August 2021 in Berlin. In an interview with The Guardian in October, Mark Strong revealed that he had finished filming scenes for the film. In November, it was reported that Sophie Kauer, Julian Glover, Allan Corduner and Sylvia Flote had joined the cast. (Kauer is a British-German classical cellist who studied at the Royal Academy of Music.) All diegetic music was recorded live on-set, including Blanchett's piano playing, Kauer's cello, and the Dresden Philharmonic's performances.

Release 
Tár premiered at the 79th Venice International Film Festival on September 1, 2022, and had its first North American screening at the Telluride Film Festival on September 3, 2022. It had a limited theatrical release on October 7, 2022, then expanded to wide release on October 28.

The film was released for VOD on November 15, 2022, followed by a Blu-ray, DVD, and 4K UHD release on December 20, 2022.

Music 

A concept album was released on October 21, 2022, featuring Guðnadóttir's score with the London Contemporary Orchestra conducted by Robert Ames, as well as a rehearsal of Gustav Mahler's Fifth Symphony with Blanchett conducting the Dresden Philharmonic. Cellist Sophie Kauer is also heard on the album playing Elgar's Cello Concerto, backed by the London Symphony Orchestra conducted by Natalie Murray Beale. For the week ending November 5, 2022, the Tár concept album topped Billboard magazine's Traditional Classical Albums at number one, ahead of albums by the actual Berlin Philharmonic.

John Mauceri served as consultant on Field's script, helping inform the tenor and accuracy of Lydia Tár's comments on classical music and musicians.

Reception

Box office 

, Tár has grossed $6.8 million in the United States and Canada, and $17.2 million in other territories, for a worldwide total of $24 million.

In the United States and Canada, it made $158,620 from four theaters in its opening weekend. The $39,655 per-screen average was the second highest of 2022 for a limited release. In its second weekend the film made $330,030 from 36 theaters. In its third weekend it made $500,035 from 141 theaters, and there was speculation in the trades that Tár was an example that there was still a place for "adult-minded fare". However, once Tár expanded to 1,087 theaters in its fourth weekend, leaving the limited specialty house run for the multiplex, it made only $1.02 million, finishing 10th. In its second week of wide release, it made $729,605 (marking a drop of 30%).

Some commentators attributed the poor U.S. domestic box office performance to the film's subject matter alienating a general audience, while others noted a larger trend in U.S. domestic art houses, 40% of which had permanently shuttered during the COVID-19 pandemic, struggling to regain their core 40–70 year-old audience, an audience more prone to health concerns and still hesitant to return to the cinema. The New York Times estimated the budget of the film "plus marketing costs" at $35 million  and argued that Tár and similar highbrow films "failed to find an audience big enough to justify their costs". IndieWire also noted that the general public's diminishing interest in seeing and supporting prestige films at the time of the film's release also played a role in the underperformance. The film performed better in the UK, Australia, France and Spain.

Critical response 

On Rotten Tomatoes, 91% of 330 critics' reviews are positive, with an average rating of 8.3/10. The website's consensus reads, "Led by the soaring melody of Cate Blanchett's note-perfect performance, Tár riffs brilliantly on the discordant side of fame-fueled power." Metacritic, which uses a weighted average, assigned the film a score of 92 out of 100, based on 59 critics, indicating "universal acclaim". Audiences surveyed by PostTrak gave the film an overall positive score of 72%, with 42% saying they would definitely recommend it.

Owen Gleiberman in his Venice Film Festival Daily Variety review wrote: "Let me say right up front: It's the work of a master filmmaker... Field's script is dazzling in its conversational flow, its insider dexterity, its perception of how power in the world actually works... Tár is not a judgement so much as a statement you can make your own judgment about. The statement is: We're in a new world."

A. O. Scott of The New York Times writing from the Telluride Film Festival and later from the New York Film Festival stated "I'm not sure I've ever seen a movie quite like Tár. Field balances Apollonian restraint with Dionysian frenzy. Tár is meticulously controlled and also scarily wild. Field finds a new way of posing the perennial question about separating the artist from the art, a question that he suggests can only be answered by another question: are you crazy? We don't care about Tár because she's an artist. We care about her because she's art."

Justin Chang for the Los Angeles Times regarded the film as "both a superb character study and a highly persuasive piece of world building", stating that the director's "storytelling draws no artificial distinction between the big and the small, the important and the mundane; everything we see and hear matters". Chang later ranked Tár as the No. 1 Academy Awards Best Picture nominee for 2023: "... there is nothing rigid about the ideas swirling through those spaces [in the film]: about cancel culture and #MeToo, about the Western canon and the artistically marginalized, about the corruptions of power and the irreducible nature of great art. Tár is irreducible, and it is great." Reviewing the film for The Hollywood Reporter, David Rooney wrote: "Tár marks yet another career peak for Blanchett—many are likely to argue her greatest—and a fervent reason to hope it's not sixteen more years before Field gives us another feature. It's a work of genius."

Richard Brody of The New Yorker, however, described Tár as "a regressive film that takes bitter aim at so-called cancel culture and lampoons so-called identity politics" and laments Field's "absence of style" in filming the music. He accuses the film of "conservative button-pushing" with a narrow aesthetic, failing to achieve dramatic unity.

Accolades

Additional reactions 

While presenting Best Film of the Year to Field at the 2022 New York Film Critics Circle Awards, Martin Scorsese praised Field's filmmaking, noting that "the clouds lifted when I experienced Todd's film."

In an interview with The Sunday Times, conductor Marin Alsop shared her dislike of the film, calling it "anti-woman", saying "I was offended: I was offended as a woman, I was offended as a conductor, I was offended as a lesbian. To have an opportunity to portray a woman in that role and to make her an abuser – for me that was heartbreaking." In response, Blanchett told BBC Radio 4, the film was a "meditation on power, and power is genderless", and that while her character shares similarities with Alsop, it is a complete work of fiction.

In The Guardian, conductor Alice Farnham thanked Blanchett, Field, and the film for "taking up the baton for female conductors", and for normalising their image. Critic Emily Bootle also defended the film in the i newspaper writing: "This is a film about power [but] sometimes we have to tolerate grey areas." Film critics Mark Kermode and Simon Mayo also disagreed with the interpretation that Tár is "anti-woman."

Writing for Time, Stephanie Zacharek went further: "Tár doesn't offer anything as comfortable as redemption, and it asks us to fall in love, at least a little, with a tyrant. ... Lydia Tár ... knows that the power of a question is greater than that of a slogan."

Music professor Ian Pace discussed the issue in The Conversation: "It would be rash to assume that such a figure could never act in a predatory and exploitative manner. This is not just an issue of identity, but power and the opportunities it provides for the reckless." Conductor Don Baton (a pen name) in City Journal agreed.

Film critic John McDonald for the Australian Financial Review wrote: "Had it been a male conductor, the story would have been a cliché. Had it been a celebration of female power, it would have been no less superficial... Field has taken the 'Maestro myth' that portrays the conductor as a kind of hypermale and shown that the same issues may apply to a woman." Several other conductors and musicians wrote in defense of the film.

In her critique for The New York Review of Books titled "The Instrumentalist", prize-winning novelist and professor Zadie Smith commended Cate Blanchett's performance, and the classroom scene at The Juilliard School was described by A. O. Scott as "a mini-course in the dos and don'ts of contemporary pedagogy."

Critic Amanda Hess wrote in The New York Times, "The online cancellation of an artistic giant can be a tedious subject, but in Tár, it acquires sneaky complications... Tár offers up a work into which we can sublimate our own Schadenfreude and sympathy for abusers. Thanks to Blanchett's luminous performance and Field's puzzle-box storytelling, we are freed to obsess."

Film critic Howie Movshovitz; critic and essayist Philippa Snow (ArtReview) and Murielle Joudet (Le Monde) draw attention to the film's creative open-endedness, allowing audiences to draw their own conclusions about its significance and meaning.

The New York Times columnist Michelle Goldberg argued that Tár is "a film about cancel culture, making it the rare piece of art that looks squarely at this social phenomenon that has roiled so many of America's meaning-making institutions... Tár demonstrates that all this flux and uncertainty is very fertile territory for art. Hopefully its success – many are predicting it will win a Best Picture Oscar – will encourage others to take on similarly thorny and unsettled issues. Hysteria about cancel culture can encourage artistic timidity by overstating the cost of probing taboos. In truth, there's a hunger out there for work that takes the strangeness of this time and turns it into something that transcends polemic."

References

External links 

 
 
 
 
 
 Official screenplay

2022 drama films
2022 films
2022 independent films
2022 LGBT-related films
2020s American films
2020s English-language films
2020s German films
2020s psychological drama films
American LGBT-related films
American psychological drama films
English-language German films
Films about classical music and musicians
Films about sexual harassment
Films directed by Todd Field
Films featuring a Best Drama Actress Golden Globe-winning performance
Films impacted by the COVID-19 pandemic
Films scored by Hildur Guðnadóttir
Films set in Berlin
Films shot in Berlin
Focus Features films
German LGBT-related films
German psychological drama films
Lesbian-related films
LGBT-related drama films
Universal Pictures films